Tilled Earth: Stories is an anthology of short stories by Manjushree Thapa. It was published on 2007 by Penguin India. It is her first short story collection and fourth book. The book was launched by poet Wayne Amtizis and filmmaker Kesang Tseten in the British Council Nepal. The book consists of twenty-one short stories.

Synopsis 
The stories in the book depicts the daily life of Nepalese people in the early 2000s. The main characters of the stories are Nepalese people who are either living in Nepal or abroad or expatriates travelling in Nepal. Some of the stories are a page long while some are novella-length.

The major themes that the stories explore are traditional Nepalese society, the caste system, the Nepalese politics and experiences of Nepalese women and Nepalese living in abroad.

Reception 
The book received mostly positive responses from the critics. Geeta Doctor of India Today magazine called the stories in the book "brilliantly balanced" with "sense of despair and celebration". Chandrahas Choudhury of Mint newspaper named "The Buddha in the Earth— Touching Posture" as his the best story in the collection. Navtej Sarna from DNA India however was unimpressed with the stories in the collection.

Khademul Islam of The Daily Star (Bangladesh) praised the anthology as "a delightful and thoughtful read".

The book was reprinted by Aleph Book Company who acquired the rights to Thapa's works.

See also 

 Arresting God in Kathmandu
 City of Dreams 
 The Tutor of History

References 

21st-century Nepalese books
2007 short story collections
Nepalese short story collections
English books by Nepalese writer
Nepalese literature in English